The Festival du Film policier de Cognac was an annual film festival that took place in Cognac, France from 1982 to 2007 (with no festival being held in 1991). The festival focused on the police/crime genre and also featured a short and a television film competition after 1993.
Capitalizing on the notoriety of the film festival, an unrelated crime book convention named Polar : Le Festival was inaugurated in 1996.

In 2007, the wine syndicate Bureau National Interprofessionel du Cognac announced that it was withdrawing its support of the 25-year-old film event.
Without its main backer, the festival's days in Cognac came to an end.
However another famed wine city, Beaune, Côte d'Or, saw value in the format and launched a successor in 2009, the Festival international du Film policier de Beaune.
Since 2010, the Cognac-based Polar : Le Festival – originally a strictly literary event – has incorporated a film competition, albeit on a much smaller scale, to compensate for the loss of the original film festival to Beaune.

Grand Prix awards 

 1982: Beyond Reasonable Doubt (1980)
 1983: 48 Hrs. (1982)
 1984: L'Addition (1984)
 1985: Funny Dirty Little War (1983)
 1986: The Hitcher (1986)
 1987: The Big Easy (1987)
 1988: The Cat (1988)
 1989: True Believer (1989)
 1990: Kill Me Again (1989)
 1992: The Hand That Rocks the Cradle (1992)
 1993: One False Move (1992)
 1994: The Escort (1993)
 1995: Shallow Grave (1994)
 1996: The Last Supper (1995)
 1997: Freeway (1996)
 1998: Face (1997)
 1999: Another Day in Paradise (1997)
 2000: Une affaire de goût (2000)
 2001: Chopper (2000)
 2002: Nueve reinas (2000)
 2003: La caja 507 (2002)
 2004: Salinui chueok (2003)
 2005: Crimen ferpecto (2004)
 2006: Silentium (2004)
 2007: A Very British Gangster

References

External links 
 Cognac Festival du Film Policier Official web site.

Film festivals in France
Film festivals established in 1982
1982 establishments in France